The Milli Muslim League is an Islamist political party launched by its president Saifullah Khalid. The professed aim of the party is to make Pakistan "a real Islamic and welfare state". The Election Commission of Pakistan does not recognise the party. The United States Department of State regards it as a front for the terrorist organisation Lashkar-e-Taiba. It also stated that its president Saifullah has ties with the alleged terrorist organization.

History
Jamat ud Dawa members announced on 7 August 2017 the creation of the political party. Party president Saifullah Khalid described the aim of the party saying, "We have decided to make a new political party, so that Pakistan is to made a real Islamic and welfare state." Tabish Qayoum,  working as the party spokesman stated they had filed registration papers for a new party with Pakistan's electoral commission. Later in August, JuD under the banner of the party fielded a candidate for the 2017 by-election of Constituency NA-120. Muhammad Yaqoob Sheikh filed his nomination papers as an independent candidate. Saifullah Khalid  stated that they will support Sheikh and he was contesting the election as an independent since MML was still in the process of getting the party registered.

The Election Commission of Pakistan in September 2017 however refused to grant recognition to MML and warned leaders against using the party's name during election campaigns. Yaqoob Sheikh won the fourth position in NA-120 bye-election, securing 5,822 votes. MML announced support for an independent candidate, Alhaj Liaqat Ali Khan, running for the NA-4 by-election, on 4 October. Liaqat Ali Khan secured 3,557 votes in the election which was won by Pakistan Tehreek-e-Insaf party. The registration application of the party was meanwhile rejected by ECP on 12 October.

Hafiz Saeed announced in December, a few days after release from house arrest on 24 November, that his organisation will contest the 2018 elections. Since its recognition was rejected, it fielded its candidates under another party Allah-o-Akbar Tehreek. It however failed to win from any seats.

Designated as terrorist organisation by the U.S. Department of State 
On 2 April 2018, the  U.S. Department of State designated the Milli Muslim League as well as Tehreek-e-Azaadi Jammu and Kashmir as aliases of the designated terrorist organisation Lashkar-e-Taiba. The department said that MML is a political front of LeT.  Both aliases were included in the Foreign terrorist organisation (FTO) list under Section 219 of the Immigration and Nationality Act, and as a Specially Designated Global Terrorist (SDGT) under Executive Order 13224. Facebook removed accounts and pages of the party on 15 July.

References

Hafiz Muhammad Saeed
2017 establishments in Pakistan
Islamic political parties in Pakistan
Political parties established in 2017
Ahl-i Hadith
Organizations designated as terrorist by the United States
Islamist front organizations
Lashkar-e-Taiba
Banned Islamist parties